A-1 Yola is the second album by rap group 11/5. It was released on July 23, 1996, for Dogday Records, and produced by Premiere Music (Reggie Smith, T.C. and Race). A-1 Yola did better on the charts than the group's previous album, Fiendin' 4 tha Funk, peaking at #33 on the Top R&B/Hip-Hop Albums and #22 on the Top Heatseekers.

Track listing

 "Intro" feat. Billy Jam - 0:33
 "Hate to See Me Have Shit" - 3:34
 "The Nade" feat. Iceman, Maine-O - 3:04
 "I Got Bitchez" feat. One Tyme - 4:39
 "Milk-A-Bitch" feat. Nia, Race, Taydatay - 3:40
 "My Hoe's Name Is Nina" feat. Baldhead Rick - 4:12
 "Dope Tales" - 3:11
 "The G That I Be" feat. Dush Tray, Fly Nate Tha Banksta, Big Mack, Taydatay - 3:51
 "Slangin' Dope" feat. Maine-O, Race - 3:50
 "3 Grams of Right" feat. Lacresha Parker, Natisha Anderson, Taydatay - 4:06
 "My Nigga Told You"- 3:41
 "When I Be All Alone" feat. Reg - 3:37
 "My Hustle" - 3:34
 "115 CC's" (The Injection) feat. Baby Menace, Big Mack, T-Lowe - 5:06

References

1996 albums
11/5 albums